Willi Hofmann (born December 27, 1940) is a Swiss bobsledder who competed in the late 1960s and early 1970s. He won a bronze medal in the four-man event at the 1968 Winter Olympics in Grenoble.

References
 Bobsleigh four-man Olympic medalists for 1924, 1932-56, and since 1964

Bobsledders at the 1968 Winter Olympics
Living people
Swiss male bobsledders
Olympic bobsledders of Switzerland
Olympic bronze medalists for Switzerland
1940 births
Olympic medalists in bobsleigh
Medalists at the 1968 Winter Olympics
20th-century Swiss people